Johann Günther Gensler (28 February 1803, Hamburg - 28 May 1884, Hamburg) was a German etcher, illustrator and painter; primarily of portraits. His known work consists of over 120 oil paintings and drawings.

Life and work 
His father was a goldsmith, who drew as a hobby.

He initially studied with Gerdt Hardorff, a friend of the family. Then, around 1822, he studied with Johann Heinrich Wilhelm Tischbein. By the mid-1820s, he and Martin were teaching art history and drawing at the Gelehrtenschule des Johanneums.

According to documentary records, he was in Dresden in 1829, and travelled to Amsterdam in 1837, where he studied the works of Rembrandt and Bartholomeus van der Helst. The year 1844 found him in Rome, seeking new inspiration, which was apparently not forthcoming.

In 2019, his works were part of the exhibition, "Hamburger Schule – Das 19. Jahrhundert neu entdeckt", at the Hamburger Kunsthalle.

References

Further reading 
 Gerhard Ahrens: "Gensler, Günther". In: Franklin Kopitzsch, Dirk Brietzke (Eds.): Hamburgische Biografie. Vol.1. Christians, Hamburg 2001, pg.103
 Alfred Lichtwark: Hermann Kauffmann und die Kunst in Hamburg von 1800 bis 1850. München 1893, S. 60–65.
 Alfred Lichtwark: Das Bildniß in Hamburg. Hamburg 1898. Bd. II, S. 175–186. (Digitalisat bei archive.org)
 Fritz Bürger: Die Gensler, drei Hamburger Malerbrüder des 19. Jahrhunderts, Heitz, Straßburg 1888 (Digitalisat)

External links 

 Günther Gensler @ Find-a-Grave

1803 births
1884 deaths
19th-century German painters
19th-century German male artists
German portrait painters
German etchers
German illustrators
Artists from Hamburg